The arcuate arteries of the kidney, also known as arciform arteries, are vessels of the renal circulation. They are located at the border of the renal cortex and renal medulla.

They are named after the fact that they are shaped in arcs due to the nature of the shape of the renal medulla.

Arcuate arteries arise from renal interlobar arteries.

References

External links
  - "Urinary System: kidney, PAS stain, arcuate artery and vein, longitudinal"
  - "Urinary System: kidney, PAS stain, arcuate artery and vein, transverse"
  - "Urinary System: neonatal kidney, vasculature"

Kidney anatomy